The 2018 Missouri Valley Conference women's soccer tournament was the postseason women's soccer tournament for the Missouri Valley Conference held from October 28 through November 4, 2018. The opening round matches of the tournament were held at campus sites, while the semifinals and final took place at Loyola Soccer Park in Chicago, Illinois. The six-team single-elimination tournament consisted of three rounds based on seeding from regular season conference play. The defending champions were the Missouri State Lady Bears, but they were eliminated from the 2018 tournament with a 1–0 loss to the Illinois State Redbirds  in the opening round. The Loyola won the tournament with a 3–2 win over Drake in the final. The conference tournament title was the first for the Loyloa women's soccer program and the first for head coach Barry Bimbi.

Bracket

Source:

Schedule

Opening Round

Semifinals

Final

Statistics

Goalscorers 
2 Goals
 Olivia Bruce - Drake
 Jenna Szczesny - Loyola

1 Goal
 Abby Basler - Illinois State
 Libby Helverson - Drake
 Madison Kimball - Loyola
 Kat Stephens - Loyola
 Abby Swanson - Loyola
 Mikayla Unger - Illinois State

All-Tournament team

Source:

See also 
 2018 Missouri Valley Conference Men's Soccer Tournament

References 

Missouri Valley Conference Women's Soccer Tournament
2018 Missouri Valley Conference women's soccer season